Anapisa sjostedti is a moth of the family Erebidae. It was described by Per Olof Christopher Aurivillius in 1904. It is found in Cameroon and Ghana.

References

Moths described in 1904
Syntomini
Insects of Cameroon
Insects of West Africa
Erebid moths of Africa